The 12th Asian Cross Country Championships took place on February 22, 2014, in Fukuoka, Japan.

Medalists

Medal table

References
 Results

Asian Cross Country Championships
Asian Cross Country
Asian Cross Country
Asian Cross Country
Asian Cross Country
Sport in Fukuoka
International athletics competitions hosted by Japan